{{DISPLAYTITLE:NZR UB class}}

The NZR UB class were a series of Ten Wheelers built by American manufacturers for New Zealand Railways (NZR) around the start of the twentieth century. Two batches were built by Baldwin in 1898 and 1901 (ten each). The earlier engines had slide valves and inside Stephenson motion, the later had piston valves and Walschaerts valve gear, as well as a higher boiler pressure. 

Two additional locomotives were obtained in 1901 from ALCO, one each from Brooks and Richmond. 
 The Brooks locomotive (#17) was heavier (30.1 long tons adhesive weight) with attendant increase in tractive effort (18340 lbf), and had a larger grate (17 sq ft). This locomotive was very popular with crews. This locomotive was dumped on the Oamaru foreshore. 
 The Richmond locomotive had less evaporative heating surface but included a superheater. Boiler pressure was lower (180 psi) and tractive effort was marginally lower. 

The locomotives were initially assigned to Dunedin to Christchurch expresses and were reassigned as newer power replaced them. The last assignment for the class was on the West Coast Region.

See also
 NZR U class
 NZR UA class
 NZR UC class
 NZR UD class
 Locomotives of New Zealand

References

Citations

Bibliography 

 
 
 

Steam locomotives of New Zealand
Scrapped locomotives
Brooks locomotives
Railway locomotives introduced in 1898